Giulia Imperio (born 7 December 2001) is an Italian weightlifter. She won the gold medal in the women's 49 kg event at the 2022 European Weightlifting Championships held in Tirana, Albania. She also won two gold medals at the 2022 Mediterranean Games held in Oran, Algeria.

Career 

In 2018, she won the silver medal in the under-17 girls 48 kg event at the European Youth Weightlifting Championships held in San Donato Milanese, Italy. She also competed in the 48 kg event at the Summer Youth Olympics held in Buenos Aires, Argentina. She also competed at the 2018 European Junior & U23 Weightlifting Championships held in Zamość, Poland and in the women's 49 kg event at the 2018 World Weightlifting Championships held in Ashgabat, Turkmenistan.

She competed at the 2019 Junior World Weightlifting Championships held in Suva, Fiji where she won the bronze medal in the women's 49 kg Snatch event. She also won the bronze medal in the junior women's 49 kg Snatch event at the 2019 European Junior & U23 Weightlifting Championships held in Bucharest, Romania.

In 2021, she competed at the European Weightlifting Championships held in Moscow, Russia. She won the bronze medal in the women's 49 kg Snatch event. She also competed at the 2021 Junior World Weightlifting Championships held in Tashkent, Uzbekistan. She won the gold medal in her event at the 2021 European Junior & U23 Weightlifting Championships held in Rovaniemi, Finland.

She won the gold medal in the women's 49 kg Snatch and Clean & Jerk events at the 2022 Mediterranean Games held in Oran, Algeria. She won the gold medal in her event at the 2022 European Junior & U23 Weightlifting Championships held in Durrës, Albania. She competed in the women's 49kg event at the 2022 World Weightlifting Championships held in Bogotá, Colombia.

Achievements

References

External links 

 

Living people
2001 births
Place of birth missing (living people)
Italian female weightlifters
Weightlifters at the 2018 Summer Youth Olympics
European Weightlifting Championships medalists
Competitors at the 2022 Mediterranean Games
Mediterranean Games gold medalists for Italy
Mediterranean Games medalists in weightlifting
21st-century Italian women